Tum Se Acha Kaun Hai is a 2002 Indian Hindi musical romantic drama film directed by Deepak Anand. Starring Siddhanta Mahapatra, Kim Sharma and Aarti Chabria, it was released on 26 April 2002.

Plot
Working as a guide and bus driver in Jaisalmer, Arjun (Nakul Kapoor) had always dreamt of being a famous singer. When he meets beautiful tourist Naina Dixit (Aarti Chabria), he impresses her with his singing. She encourages him to come to Bombay to try his luck there and leaves her address with him. Shortly thereafter, Arjun bids farewell to his brother, his sister in law (Navni Parihar) and nephew and goes to Bombay. Upon arrival he meets Naina's friend, Monto (Raghuvir Yadav), who takes him to several places to try his luck. No one bothers to listen to him, let alone hear him sing.

He lives with Naina, her sisters, Anu and Tuktuk, and their college professor mom (Rati Agnihotri), who empathize with him. Then Naina hits upon an idea to have an open song-and-dance show in a public park. The show goes well, and a wealthy young woman, Bobby (Kim Sharma), notices Arjun and invites him to sing for a firm run by her dad's partner, Sunil Mahadevan. When Sunil refuses to get involved, Bobby talks to her dad Gujral (Dalip Tahil) and opens her own recording company with his help, featuring Arjun as the main artist. Bobby and Gujral are very supportive of Nakul.

Arjun becomes famous overnight but has not forgotten Naina and her family. This does not augur well with Bobby, who is very possessive and wants Arjun all to herself. She makes up her mind that she will never permit anyone to come close to Arjun—she has a gun and knows how to use it. But soon she realizes that she can't get him as he belongs to Naina and loves her only. Unable to cope with the pressure of losing her love, Bobby tries to commit suicide by throwing herself from the hill with her car. After some time, Arjun is shown receiving the award for best singer and thanking Bobby. Then it is shown that Bobby now in a mentally and physically disabled condition is watching Arjun live, seeing him thank her.

Cast
 Nakul Kapoor as Arjun Singh
 Rati Agnihotri as Professor Dixit
 Aarti Chabria as Naina Dixit
 Kim Sharma as Bobby Gujral
 Adi Irani as Amar Deep
  Ali Asgar as Ali
 Viju Khote as Inspector Vijay Chander
 Anant Mahadevan as Sunil Mahadevan
 Neha Pendse as Anu Dixit
 Navni Parihar as Arjun's Sister in Law
 Girja Shankar as Arjun's brother
 Dalip Tahil as Gujral
 Neeraj Vora as Music Producer
 Raghuvir Yadav as Manto

Soundtrack
All the songs are composed by Nadeem-Shravan duo and lyrics were penned by Sameer. The songs were very popular upon release and specially "Ankh Hai Bhari Bhari" remains a memorable one from the magical album.

External links
 
 Review by Taran Adarsh
 Review by Rediff
 Review by Planet Bollywood

2002 films
2000s Hindi-language films
2002 romantic drama films
Films scored by Nadeem–Shravan
Indian romantic drama films
2000s romantic musical films
Indian romantic musical films
Films scored by Surinder Sodhi